Xerophloea viridis is a species of leafhopper in the family Cicadellidae.

References

Further reading

External links

 

Ledrinae
Insects described in 1794